The Wesley–Ciskei Wind Power Station is a 34.5 megawatts wind power energy project, under construction in South Africa. The power station is under development and is owned by EDF Renewables, a subsidiary of the French energy conglomerate Électricité de France (EDF). EDF won the concession for this project in June 2015, during the 4th round of the South African government's Renewable Energy Independent Power Producer Procurement of South Africa (REIPPP).

Location
The wind farm is located outside the settlement of Wesley, in Amathole District, in the Eastern Cape Province of South Africa. The geographical coordinates of Wesley-Ciskei Wind Farm are 33°18'09.0"S, 27°22'14.0"E (Latitude:-33.302500; Longitude:27.370556).

Overview
South Africa's Renewable Energy Supply Programme (REIPPP), is a public-procurement program of the South African government conceived in the 2000s and implemented in the 2010s and thereafter. It aims at attracting independent power producers (IPPs) to invest in renewable power generation in the country. As of April 2019, four rounds of bidding have resulted in the award of 102 power projects, with more expected in future. The target is 7,000 megawatts in renewable generation in the short term and 17,800 in the medium term.

EDF won the bid to design, fund, build and operate this wind farm. The energy generated will be sold to Eskom, the South African electric utility company under a 20-year power purchase agreement. EDF assigned its subsidiary EDF Renewables RSA to carry out the development. The farm comprises ten turbines of the Vestas V126-3.45 variety, capable of generating 3.45 megawatts each.

Construction and timeline
The engineering, procurement and construction (EPC) contract was awarded to Vestas, the international manufacturer of wind turbines headquartered in Demark, with manufacturing plants in nearly 20 countries. Vestas supplied the equipment, installed the equipment on site, installed the "VestasOnline Business SCADA" system, which allows remote monitoring and some adjustment of each individual turbine.

Construction began in September 2019 and commercial commissioning in expected in September 2021.

See also

 List of power stations in South Africa
 Oyster Bay Wind Power Station
 Kangnas Wind Power Station

References

External links
 EDF connects 34.5 MW Wesley-Ciskei wind farm in South Africa to the grid As of 28 July 2021.

Economy of the Eastern Cape
Power stations in South Africa
Wind farms in South Africa
Energy infrastructure in Africa
2021 establishments in South Africa
Energy infrastructure completed in 2021
Amathole District Municipality
21st-century architecture in South Africa